Archidendron lucidum is a tree species in the legume family (Fabaceae).

References

lucidum